The Master of Requests was a Great Officer of State in the kingdoms of England and Scotland.

Masters of Requests (England)
In England the office was created in the 15th century and abolished in 1685. For main article, see Master of Requests (England).

Masters of Requests Ordinary

Masters of Requests Extraordinary  - partial list
 1591–1596: Julius Caesar
 1630–1640: Robert Mason 
 1660: Sir Edmund Pierce

Masters of Requests (Scotland)
In Scotland the office first appeared  in the reign of King James V. Its functions in Scotland differed from those of the offices in England and France and included the receiving of petitions from subjects and presenting them for consideration by the Scottish Privy Council. After 1603, the Scottish Master of Requests acted as an intermediary between the Council in Scotland and the King in England.  Although not named as an Officer of State in 1579, he was "to have acces in the counsalehouse and be present in tyme of counsale". In 1592, however, he was included with the Secretary, the Lord Justice Clerk, the Lord Advocate and the Lord Clerk Register who "being ordinar officaris of the estait as also senatouris of the college of justice" could not attend council on a daily basis.

The Master of Requests sat in the Scottish Parliament as an officer of State from 1604 to 1633, but his office was not revived at the Restoration, its duties being taken over by the Secretary.

 Masters of Requests Ordinary - partial list
 1577-1606: Mark Kerr, 1st Earl of Lothian
 1606: Robert Kerr, 2nd Earl of Lothian
 1614: Sir William Alexander (died 1640)

Notes

See also
 Master of Requests (France)

Masters of Requests
Masters of Requests
Masters of Requests